Sir Henry Strachey, 1st Baronet (23 May 1736 – 3 January 1810) was a British civil servant and politician who sat in the House of Commons for 39 years from 1768 to 1807.

Life
Strachey was the eldest son of Henry Strachey, of Sutton Court, Somerset, and his first wife Helen, daughter of Robert Clerk, a Scottish physician. 
His grandfather was the geologist John Strachey and his great-grandfather John Strachey was a friend of John Locke. 

He was appointed private secretary to Lord Clive in India in 1762, a position he held until 1768, when he was returned to Parliament for Pontefract. He sat for this constituency until 1774, and later represented Bishop's Castle from 1774 to 1778 and from 1780 to 1802, Saltash from 1774 to 1780 and East Grinstead from 1802 to 1807.
Strachey was Clerk of the Deliveries of the Ordnance from 1778 to 1780 and Principal Storekeeper of the Ordnance from October 1780 to May 1782 and after a hiatus again in 1783–84. He served under the Marquess of Rockingham as Joint Secretary to the Treasury in 1782 and under the Earl of Shelburne as Joint Under-Secretary of State for the Home Department from 1782 to 1783.
 
He took part in the peace negotiations with the American colonies in Paris in 1783 with Richard Oswald representing the British and John Jay, Johns Adams and Benjamin Franklin representing the Americans. 
This resulted in the Treaty of Paris (1783). He later served as Master of the Household between 1794 and 1810.

In 1801, he was created a Baronet, of Sutton Court in the County of Somerset.

Strachey died in January 1810, aged 72, and was succeeded in the baronetcy by his eldest son Henry. His memorial in Chew Magna was created by John Bacon.

Family
In 1770 Strachey married Jane, only daughter of Capt. John Kelsall (1702-1787), the widow of Capt. Thomas Latham. They had three sons and one daughter. His second son Edward Strachey was the father of John Strachey and Lieutenant-General Sir Richard Strachey and the grandfather of Lytton Strachey, James Strachey, Oliver Strachey and Dorothy Bussy. 
Other descendants of Strachey include the Liberal politician Edward Strachey, 1st Baron Strachie, the journalist John Strachey and the Labour politician John Strachey. 
Lady Strachey died on 12 February 1824.

References

Attribution:

External links 
 
Kidd, Charles, Williamson, David (editors). Debrett's Peerage and Baronetage (1990 edition). New York: St Martin's Press, 1990, 

 

|-

1736 births
1810 deaths
Baronets in the Baronetage of the United Kingdom
Masters of the Household
Henry, 1st Baronet
Members of the Parliament of Great Britain for English constituencies
Members of the Parliament of Great Britain for Saltash
British MPs 1768–1774
British MPs 1774–1780
British MPs 1780–1784
Members of the Parliament of the United Kingdom for English constituencies
UK MPs 1801–1802
UK MPs 1802–1806
UK MPs 1806–1807